Sloppiness may refer to:
Sloppiness space, a concept in graphonomics
Sloppiness (physics), a concept in physics